Lin Kun-sheng  (born 8 March 1987) is a Taiwanese baseball catcher who plays with the Fubon Guardians in the Chinese Professional Baseball League.

He represented Taiwan at the 2003 World Youth Championships, 2007 Baseball World Cup, 2008 Haarlem Baseball Week, 2008 World University Baseball Championship, 2009 World Port Tournament, 2009 World Baseball Classic and 2017 World Baseball Classic.

References

1987 births
Living people
2009 World Baseball Classic players
2017 World Baseball Classic players
Baseball players from Taichung
Fubon Guardians players
EDA Rhinos players
Asian Games medalists in baseball
Baseball players at the 2010 Asian Games
Baseball players at the 2014 Asian Games
Medalists at the 2010 Asian Games
Medalists at the 2014 Asian Games
Asian Games silver medalists for Chinese Taipei